Elvis Rock, RCA's 2006 compilation—part of a six-set of six theme-based compilations that also includes Elvis Country, Elvis Movies, Elvis Inspirational, Elvis Live and Elvis R&B.
On January 12, 2018 the RIAA awarded the disc with a Gold Record, corresponding for  US sales in excess of 500,000.

Track listing

Credits

References

Elvis Presley compilation albums
RCA Records compilation albums
2006 compilation albums
Pop rock compilation albums
Compilation albums published posthumously